Michael Collier may refer to:

 Michael Collier (photographer), American photographer
 Michael Collier (poet) (born 1953), American poet, teacher and editor
 Michael Collier (swimmer) (born 1971), Sierra Leonean swimmer
 Mike Collier (born 1953), American football player